As of July 2016, the International Union for Conservation of Nature (IUCN) lists 37 extinct in the wild plant species. Approximately 0.17% of all evaluated plant species are listed as extinct in the wild. 
The IUCN also lists two plant subspecies as extinct in the wild.

This is a complete list of extinct in the wild plant species and subspecies as evaluated by the IUCN. All are vascular plant (tracheophytes).

Pteridophytes
Diplazium laffanianum, Governor Laffan's fern

Gymnosperms

Dicotyledons

Species

Monocotyledons

See also 
 List of extinct in the wild animals
 List of least concern plants
 List of near threatened plants
 List of vulnerable plants
 List of endangered plants
 List of critically endangered plants
 List of recently extinct plants
 List of data deficient plants

References 

 01
Plants
Plants
Extinct in the wild plants